Events from the year 1815 in Germany.

Incumbents

Kingdoms 
 Kingdom of Prussia
 Monarch – Frederick William III of Prussia (16 November 1797 – 7 June 1840)
 Kingdom of Bavaria
 Maximilian I (1 January 1806 – 13 October 1825)
 Kingdom of Saxony
 Frederick Augustus I (20 December 1806 – 5 May 1827)
 Kingdom of Hanover
 George III (25 October 1760 –29 January 1820)
 Kingdom of Württemberg
 Frederick I (22 December 1797 – 30 October 1816)

Grand Duchies 
 Grand Duke of Baden
 Charles 10 June 1811 – 8 December 1818
 Grand Duke of Hesse
 Louis I (14 August 1806 – 6 April 1830)
 Grand Duke of Mecklenburg-Schwerin
 Frederick Francis I– (24 April 1785 – 1 February 1837)
 Grand Duke of Mecklenburg-Strelitz
 Charles II (2 June 1794 – 6 November 1816)
 Grand Duke of Oldenburg
 Wilhelm (6 July 1785 –2 July 1823 ) Due to mental illness, Wilhelm was duke in name only, with his cousin Peter, Prince-Bishop of Lübeck, acting as regent throughout his entire reign.
 Peter I (2 July 1823 - 21 May 1829)
 Grand Duke of Saxe-Weimar-Eisenach
 Karl August  (1809–1815)

Principalities 
 Schaumburg-Lippe
 George William (13 February 1787 - 1860)
 Schwarzburg-Rudolstadt
 Friedrich Günther (28 April 1807 - 28 June 1867)
 Schwarzburg-Sondershausen
 Günther Friedrich Karl I (14 October 1794 - 19 August 1835)
 Principality of Lippe
 Leopold II (5 November 1802 - 1 January 1851)
 Principality of Reuss-Greiz
 Heinrich XIII (28 June 1800-29 January 1817)
 Waldeck and Pyrmont
 George II (9 September 1813 - 15 May 1845)

Duchies 
 Duke of Anhalt-Dessau
 Leopold III (16 December 1751 – 9 August 1817)
 Duke of Brunswick
 Frederick William (16 October 1806 – 16 June 1815)
 Charles II (16 June 1815 – 9 September 1830)
 Duke of Saxe-Altenburg
 Duke of Saxe-Hildburghausen (1780–1826)  - Frederick
 Duke of Saxe-Coburg and Gotha
 Ernest I (9 December 1806 – 12 November 1826)
 Duke of Saxe-Meiningen
 Bernhard II (24 December 1803–20 September 1866)
 Duke of Schleswig-Holstein-Sonderburg-Beck
Frederick Charles Louis (24 February 1775 – 25 March 1816)

Events 
 3 January – Austria, Britain, and Bourbon-restored France form a secret defensive alliance treaty against Prussia and Russia.

 9 June – The Final Act of the Congress of Vienna is signed: A new European political situation is set. The German Confederation and Congress Poland are created, and the neutrality of Switzerland is guaranteed. Also, Luxembourg declares independence from the French Empire.
 16 June-Napoleonic Wars – Battle of Ligny: Napoleon defeats a Prussian army under Gebhard Leberecht von Blücher.
 2 August – Napoleonic Wars: Representatives of the United Kingdom, Austria, Russia and Prussia sign a convention at Paris, declaring that Napoleon Bonaparte is "their prisoner" and that "His safekeeping is entrusted to the British Government."
 26 September – Austria, Prussia and Russia sign a Holy Alliance, to uphold the European status quo.
 20 November – The Napoleonic Wars come to an end after 12 years, with the British government restoring the status quo of France, prior to when the French Revolution began in 1789.

Births 
 15 January – Bertha Wehnert-Beckmann, German photographer (d. 1901)
 11 March – Anna Bochkoltz, German operatic soprano, voice teacher and composer (d. 1879)
 1 April- Otto von Bismarck, German statesman (d. 1898)
 6 April – Robert Volkmann, German composer (d. 1883)
 18 June – Ludwig Freiherr von und zu der Tann-Rathsamhausen, Bavarian general (d. 1881)
 26 July – Robert Remak, German embryologist, physiologist and neurologist  (d. 1865)
 31 October – Karl Weierstrass, German mathematician (d. 1897)
 8 December – Adolph Menzel, German artist, painter (d. 1905)

Deaths 
 5 March – Franz Mesmer, German developer of animal magnetism (b. 1734)
 11 May – Aletta Haniel, German business person (b. 1742)
 16 June – Friedrich Wilhelm, Duke of Brunswick-Wolfenbüttel, German noble, general (killed in battle) (b. 1771)
 3 July – Friedrich Wilhelm von Reden, German pioneer in mining and metallurgy (b. 1752)

References 

Years of the 19th century in Germany

 
Germany
Germany